Bruce Jarvis (born November 3, 1948) is a former professional American football player, an offensive lineman for four seasons for the Buffalo Bills of the National Football League.

Early years
Born in Seattle, Jarvis graduated from its Franklin High School and played college football at the University of Washington in Seattle under head coach Jim Owens. As a senior center in 1970, he snapped the ball to sophomore quarterback

Buffalo Bills
Jarvis was chosen 53rd overall in the 1971 NFL Draft by the Buffalo Bills, the first pick of the third round on January 28. As a rookie in 1971, Jarvis immediately became the starting center, replacing Frank Marchlewski. The Bill had an awful season, winning only 1 of 14 games, the worst offense in the entire NFL, with 184 points (13.1 points/game). Jarvis was injured in the opening game of 1972 season; he was succeeded by Remi Prudhomme and the Bills had a  season, their last on the natural grass of 

In 1973, the Bills opened the new Rich Stadium in Orchard Park, with artificial turf, and Jarvis partly got his job back, starting 8 of 14 games.

Jarvis retired from the NFL at age 26, during the Bills' training camp in July 1975.

References

External links
 

1948 births
American football offensive linemen
Buffalo Bills players
Washington Huskies football players
Living people
Franklin High School (Seattle) alumni